Kanala Khada is an Indian television chat show in Marathi language originally aired on Zee Marathi. It was hosted by Sanjay Mone and premiered from 30 November 2018.

Concept 
The show invited celebrity guests every week to talk about their personalities, controversies, relations and they share their special experiences which made them to remember as "Kanala Khada".

Celebrity Guests 
 Rakhi Sawant
 Shreya Bugade
 Swapnil Joshi
 Bhalchandra Kadam
 Anita Date-Kelkar
 Rohini Hattangadi
 Abhijeet Khandkekar
 Surekha Punekar
 Anand Shinde
 Vaibhav Mangle
 Ashok Saraf
 Sonalee Kulkarni
 Tejashri Pradhan
 Sanjay Narvekar
 Jitendra Joshi
 Sai Tamhankar
 Ravindra Kolhe
 Priya Arun
 Renuka Shahane
 Kishori Shahane
 Tejaswini Pandit
 Abhinay Berde
 Shreegauri Sawant
 Makrand Deshpande
 Jagannath Dixit

References

External links 
 
 Kanala Khada at ZEE5
 
Zee Marathi original programming
Marathi-language television shows
Indian reality television series
2018 Indian television series debuts
2019 Indian television series endings